Pontsho "Piro" Moloi (born 28 November 1981) is a Motswana footballer who plays as a forward for Mochudi Centre Chiefs. He has been capped at international level by the Botswana national team.

Career
Moloi has played club football for local sides Notwane F.C. and Mochudi Centre Chiefs. In 2009, he went on a one-season loan to Bay United F.C. of South Africa's National First Division.

International goals
Scores and results list Botswana's goal tally first.

References

External links 

1981 births
Living people
People from Gaborone
Botswana footballers
Botswana international footballers
Botswana expatriate footballers
Mochudi Centre Chiefs SC players
Association football forwards
Notwane F.C. players
Botswana expatriate sportspeople in South Africa
Expatriate soccer players in South Africa
2012 Africa Cup of Nations players
Bay United F.C. players